is a Japanese comedy manga series written and illustrated by Saki Nakagawa and published in Bessatsu Shōnen Magazine from April 2012 to July 2016.  The series is a parody of Hajime Isayama's manga series .

The manga has been adapted into an anime television series which began airing in October 2015.  A rebroadcast was aired during January 2016. A sequel, known by its subtitle,  ran from June 2018 to August 2018 and consisted of six chapters.

Plot
The story focuses on their adventures during the first year at school.

Characters

First-year students

English: “Eren Jaeger”

Eren Yeager is a hot-blooded young boy who especially enjoys eating cheeseburgers. He harbors an intense hatred of Titans due to an incident where the Colossal Titan (the principal of the Titan campus) stole his lunch, and is driven to break school rules in order to eliminate all the Titans in the world.  While he does not have the uncanny strength of Mikasa or the intelligence of Armin, his ambition to exterminate the Titans drives him to complete and exceed his goals, and astonish his classmates with his passion and drive.

English: “Mikasa Ackermann”

Mikasa Ackerman is a stoic girl who seemingly has a handle on most situations that often disarrays, scares or incapacitates her peers. She is very close to Eren, to the point that she becomes depressed and all her abilities are greatly reduced when he is not present. She is very protective of both Eren and Armin, seeing them as her precious family she cannot lose.

English: “Armin Arlelt”

Armin Arlert is a very intelligent but sickly boy who regularly wears a futon over his head to avoid catching a cold. He is a good friend to Eren and Mikasa, and frequently relies on their protection. Despite his poor self-esteem, his intellect often serves to aid his friends in bad situations.

Reiner Braun is a very muscular student, who is always seen together with his friend Bertolt, for whom he tries to help find a girlfriend. He has a crush on Krista and always tries to woo her.

English: “Bertholdt Hoover”

Bertolt Hoover is a very tall, quiet student and a close friend to Reiner, and loves die-cutting as a hobby. He secretly crushes on Annie during the summer festival.

Annie Leonhart is an introverted girl whose strength rivals that of Mikasa. Like Eren, she also loves cheeseburgers and attends student council.

English: “Jean Kirschtein”

Jean Kirstein is an egotistic boy whose primary concern in school is becoming popular amongst girls. He has a crush on Mikasa, and frequently comes into conflict with Eren.

English: “Marco Bodt”

Marco Bott is a friendly student and a good friend to Jean, whom he tries his best to help.

English: “Conny Springer”

Connie Springer is a sporty, outgoing boy with a buzz cut. Despite his upbeat personality, he is quite slow-witted.

English: “Sasha Braus”

Sasha Blouse is a fun-loving girl with a gluttonous appetite who spends most of her time thinking about food.

She is a petite, friendly and warm-hearted girl who is well loved by her peers, to the point many express their wishes to marry her. Her father is Rod Reiss.

Ymir is a close friend of Krista. She is extremely protective of Krista, often thwarting Reiner, is always around her side, and she openly claims to want to marry her.

Thomas Wagner is one of Eren's classmates.

Mīna Carolina is one of Eren's classmates.

Hannah Diamant is one of Eren's classmates. She spends almost the entire time affectionately hugging her boyfriend Franz, rather than paying attention to anything else around them.

Franz Kefka is one of Eren's classmates. He spends almost the entire time affectionately hugging his girlfriend Hannah, rather than paying attention to anything else around them.

Hitch Dreyse is a fellow student and a student council friend of Annie, and likes to poke fun of her other classmate, Marlowe. Though she denies it, Hitch is a fanatic cat lover.

English: “Marlo Freudenberg”

Marlowe Freudenberg is a fellow student and student council fellow of Annie.

Second-year students

English: “Petra Rall”

Petra Ral is a member of the secret unauthorized club, the Scout Regiment. She is very friendly and welcoming to the freshmen, but is cruelly sarcastic to her fellow member Oluo.

English: “Oluo Bozado”

Oluo Bozado is a member of the Scout Regiment club. He is narcissistic and has a nasty tendency to bite his tongue frequently for no reason.

English: “Eld Gin”

Eld Jinn is a member of the Scout Regiment club.

Günther Schultz is a member of the Scout Regiment club.

Rico Brzenska is the leader of the Wall Cleanup Club, which Eren and his friends are forced to join, and is in charge of scrubbing off the graffiti painted on the wall by the Titan pranksters. She teaches the younger students on how to scale the wall using the Vertical Maneuvering Gears.

Ian Dietrich is one of Rico's sidekicks and the deputy leader of the Wall Cleanup Club.

Ilse Langnar is a senior student who works as the gossip reporter of the Newspaper Club, and is constantly recording notes in her journal.

Third-year students

English: “Levi Ackermann” 

Levi is the leader of Attack Junior High's secret underground club, Scout Regiment, and is reputed to be the strongest man in the world, capable of knocking out a Titan with a single slap from his paper fan. He has a compulsive trait for tidiness.

English: “Zoë Hange” 

Hange Zoë is Levi's classmate and the deputy leader of the Scout Regiment club. She is obsessed with anything related to the study of Titans, often to the annoyance of Levi, who calls her by the nickname "Abnormal" or "four-eyes".

English: “Miche Zacharius”

Mike Zacharius is a senior student who is a sidekick of Hange, and has a peculiar habit of sniffing younger students.

Moblit Berner is a senior student who is a sidekick of Hange. He is regularly frightened and frustrated by Hange's eccentric and reckless behaviours involving Titans.

Staff

English: “Keith Sadies”

Keith Shadis is the strict and intimidating class teacher of Eren and his friends. He is also a good friend of Eren's father.

Erwin Smith is a school teacher, a senior member of the teachers' board, and the club adviser of the secret Scout Regiment.

Hannes is the frequently drunk janitor who works at the Titan side of the school campus, and also the adviser of the Wall Cleanup Club. He is a good friend of Eren's mother.

English: “Darius Zachary”

Darius Zackly is the head of the teachers' board, and the principal of the human campus of Attack Junior High.

English: “Dot Pyxis”

Dot Pixis is a senior member of the teachers' board.

English: “Nile Dawk”

Nile Dok is a senior member of the teachers' board.

Kitz Weilman is a member of the teachers' board.

Other characters

English: “Carla Jaeger”

Carla Jaeger is Eren's mother, who prepares his beloved cheeseburger steak lunch everyday.

English: “Dieter Neiss”

Dita Ness is the owner of a shooting gallery at the Summer Festival.

Frieda is a former student of Attack Junior High, who got lost in the school building during the Test of Courage. She is since condemned to haunt the campus as a ghost, namely "the Seven Wonders of Attack Junior High, No. 7".

Media

Manga
Saki Nakagawa began publishing Attack on Titan: Junior High in the May issue of Kodansha's monthly manga magazine Bessatsu Shōnen Magazine on April 9, 2012.  A special chapter was published in the May issue of the Monthly Shōnen Sirius magazine on March 25, 2014. In the June 2016 issue, published on May 9, Nakagawa commented that the manga would be ending soon; the final chapter was published in the magazine's August issue, on July 9, 2016.

The series was published in tankōbon form by Kodansha. It has been licensed for publication in North America by Kodansha USA.  The series has been collected into eleven tankōbon volumes, published as five volumes in English. The additional chapters were published in a single volume in August 2018.

Sequel
A sequel, known by its subtitle,  was published in six chapters between June and August 2018 and collected into one volume.

Volume list

Anime
An anime television series adaptation was announced in July 2015.  The series is directed by Yoshihide Ibata and written by Midori Gotou, with animation by animation studio Production I.G. Yuuko Yahiro provides character designs for the series, and Asami Tachibana composes the show's music although most of the music comes from the first season of the main anime. Kazuhiro Arai from Studio Homare is the series' art director, and Tetsuya Takahashi serves as director of photography. Taeko Hamauzu is the anime's editor and Masafumi Mima serves as sound director.  Linked Horizon performs the series' opening theme, .  The ending theme, is performed by the voice actors for Eren, Mikasa, and Jean.  All cast members from the main anime reprise their roles for Attack on Titan: Junior High. The series premiered on October 4, 2015, and aired on MBS, Tokyo MX, BS11, RKK, and SBS.  The anime portion is followed by a live-action segment composed of two parts, "Shingeki! Treasure Hunt" and "Sasha Tries ?? By Herself!!"; the former features the voice actors for Eren, Mikasa, Armin, and Bertholdt, and the latter features the voice actress for Sasha alongside a mascot called Titan-kun.  The series was licensed in North America by Funimation, and is simulcast on their website. Following Sony's acquisition of Crunchyroll, the series was moved to Crunchyroll. The anime was distributed in the United Kingdom by Anime Limited.

Episode list

Reception
Volume one made it onto The New York Times Manga Best Sellers list for three weeks, debuting at number eight before rising to number five.

Notes

References

External links
  at Bessatsu Shōnen Magazine 
  
  at Kodansha USA
 

Junior High
Parody anime and manga
School life in anime and manga
Kodansha manga
Manga adapted into television series
Shōnen manga
Production I.G
Anime spin-offs
Anime series based on manga
Comics spin-offs
Crunchyroll anime